Coales is a surname. Notable people with the name include:

 John Flavell Coales {1907–1999), British physicist and engineer
 William Coales (1886–1960), English long-distance runner

See also
 Coale (surname)
 Coles (disambiguation)